Angela Anna Christ (born 6 March 1989) is a Dutch football goalkeeper, who played for Eredivisie club PSV and for the Netherlands women's national football team.

Club career
While playing with previous club FC Utrecht she was twice named the Eredivisie's best goalkeeper, in 2010 and 2011. Before Eredivisie's foundation in 2007, she won two Hoofdklasse titles with SV Saestum and had debuted in the top division as a 14-year-old, with ODC Boxtel in 2003–04.

In 2012, she joined PSV/FC Eindhoven ahead of the newly created BeNe League.

International career
Christ made her senior Netherlands women's national football team debut on 13 July 2009, a 3–2 win over South Africa in Amsterdam. She was taken to UEFA Women's Euro 2009 in Finland as one of two back-ups to recognised first choice goalkeeper Loes Geurts.

In June 2013 national team coach Roger Reijners selected Christ in the squad for UEFA Women's Euro 2013 in Sweden. She was also part of the Dutch teams of the 2015 FIFA Women's World Cup and the winning team of the UEFA Women's Euro 2017.

On 24 November 2017, she played her 17th match for the national team against Slovakia in a 2019 FIFA Women's World Cup qualification match which the Netherlands won by 5–0, a few days later, she announced her retirement from the national team.

Honours

Club
 Dutch Leagues (2): 2005, 2006
 Dutch Cup (1): 2010
 Dutch Supercup (3): 2005, 2006, 2010

International
 UEFA European Women's Championship (1): 2017

References

External links
Angela Christ profile on Onsoranje (in Dutch)
Angela Christ profile on women's Netherlands (in Dutch)
Angela Christ profile on UEFA.com

1989 births
Living people
Dutch women's footballers
Netherlands women's international footballers
Footballers from Eindhoven
Eredivisie (women) players
2015 FIFA Women's World Cup players
PSV (women) players
FC Utrecht (women) players
UEFA Women's Championship-winning players
Women's association football goalkeepers
Knights of the Order of Orange-Nassau
SV Saestum players
UEFA Women's Euro 2017 players